Alberto Farnese (3 June 1926 – 2 June 1996) was an Italian actor. He appeared in more than 80 films and television shows between 1951 and 1989. He starred in the film Whom God Forgives, which won the Silver Bear Extraordinary Prize of the Jury award at the 7th Berlin International Film Festival.

Selected filmography

 Nobody's Children (1951) - Poldo
 Rome 11:00 (1952) - Augusto
 Falsehood (1952) - Gianni
 Prisoners of Darkness (1952)
 Legione straniera (1953) - Alberto Gherardi
 Angels of Darkness (1954) - The Sportsman
 Disonorata - Senza colpa (1954) - Amedeo Cupiello
 The Two Orphans (1954)
 The Gold of Naples (1954) - Alfredo - l'amante di Sofia (segment "Pizze a credito")
 Orphan of the Ghetto (1954)
 Disowned (1954) - barone Giulio Colizzi
 Due lacrime (1954) - Mario Mancini
 The White Angel (1955) - Poldo
 The Song of the Heart (1955) - Sandro
 Un palco all'opera (1956)
 Torna piccina mia! (1955) - Alberto
 Vendicata! (1956)
 Storia di una minorenne (1956)
 Un giglio infranto (1956) - Il conte Andrea Posterla
 Porta un bacione a Firenze (1956) - Alberto Cei
 Mamma sconosciuta (1956) - Aldo Martini
 Whom God Forgives (1957) - Pedro
 Pirate of the Half Moon (1957) - Alonzo de Carmona / Ugo van Berg
 The Angel of the Alps (1957) - Massimo
 Un amore senza fine (1958) - Ing. Alberto Danieli
 Conspiracy of the Borgias (1959) - Enzo de Rovena
 Knight Without a Country (1959) - Rizziero - duca di Villalta
 Sheba and the Gladiator (1959) - Marcello
 Caterina Sforza, la leonessa di Romagna (1959) - Girolamo Riario
 Le secret du Chevalier d'Éon (1959) - Serguei Orloff (uncredited)
 The Night of the Great Attack (1959) - Cesare Borgia
 Terror of Oklahoma (1959) - Bogart
 Siege of Syracuse (1960) - Marcello
 The Warrior Empress (1960) - Larico
 Colossus and the Amazon Queen (1960) - Losco, il pirata
 The Giants of Thessaly (1960) - Adrasto
 Three Faces of Sin (1961) - (uncredited)
 Nefertiti, Queen of the Nile (1961) - Dakim
 The Giant of Metropolis (1961) - (uncredited)
 The Wonders of Aladdin (1961) - Bandit Chieftain
 Suleiman the Conqueror (1961) - Gaspard
 The Corsican Brothers (1961) - Gaspare
 Caccia all'uomo (1961) - Paolo
 Kerim, Son of the Sheik (1962) - Omar
 Gladiator of Rome (1962) - Magistrate Vezio Rufo
 I Don Giovanni della Costa Azzurra (1962) - Commendatore milanese
 The Executioner of Venice (1963) - Michele Arcà
 The Lion of St. Mark (1963) - Titta
 Revenge of the Black Knight (1963) - Amedeo Aniante
 Vino, whisky e acqua salata (1963)
 The Two Gladiators (1964) - Leto
 Sandokan to the Rescue (1964) - Tremal Naik
 Hercules of the Desert (1964) - Masura
 Sandokan Against the Leopard of Sarawak (1964) - Tremal Naik
 Dollar of Fire (1966) - Senator Dana Harper
 Five Dollars for Ringo (1966) - Mayor Aldo Rudell
 Río maldito (1966) - Torrence
 Kill or Be Killed (1966) - Chester Griffith
 Honeymoon, Italian Style (1966) - Portiere dell'Hotel
 Addio mamma (1967) - Paolo Solari
 The Magnificent Tony Carrera (1968) - Rick
 The Wedding Trip (1969) - Rossano Bertorelli
 Una ragazza di Praga (1969)
 Veinte pasos para la muerte (1970) - Aleck Kellaway
 Tell Me (1970)
 Fighters from Ave Maria (1970) - John Parker
 Love Me Strangely (1971) - L'ami d'Alain
 Il ritorno del gladiatore più forte del mondo (1971) - Tullio Valerio
 Gang War in Naples (1972) - Croupier
 Storia di fifa e di coltello - Er seguito d'er più (1972)
 The Dominici Affair (1973) - Un journaliste italien
 Tony Arzenta (1973) - The Man who meets Carré in the nightclub
 Supermen Against the Orient (1973) - Colonnello Roger
 Il bacio di una morta (1974) - Lawyer of Guido
 White Horses of Summer (1975) - Arturo
 Il giustiziere di mezzogiorno (1975) - Signor Lorenzi
 Squadra antitruffa (1977) - Avv. Ferrante
 Assassinio sul Tevere (1979) - Manfredo Ruffini
 Zappatore (1980) - Mike Barker - Nancy's father
 Crema, cioccolata e pa... prika (1981) - Bonetti
 I mercenari raccontano (1985) - Johnson, il mercenario
 Detective School Dropouts (1986) - Don Falcone
 White Apache (1987) - The Governor
 Scalps (1987) - Colonel Connor
 Fiori di zucca (1989) - Padre di Enzo
 Diritto di vivere (1989)
 Vite perdute (1992) - Avvocato di Rosario

References

External links

1926 births
1996 deaths
Italian male film actors
20th-century Italian male actors
People of Lazian descent